Mark Ashton Richardson (born 26 July 1972, in Slough) is an English former athlete who competed mainly in the 400 metres and 4 x 400 metres relay for Great Britain and England. He won the gold medal in the 4 x 400 metres relay at the 1997 World Championships, and again in the same event at the 1998 European Championshipss. At the Olympic Games, he won relay silver and bronze medals in 1992 and 1996. In the individual event, Richardson's most significant international results were silver at the 1998 Commonwealth Games and bronze in the 1998 European Championships, in addition to three domestic championships gold medals between 1995 and 2002.

As of July 2022, Richardson was ranked joint third in the all-time Great Britain lists for 400 metres

Athletics career
He competed for Great Britain in the 1996 Summer Olympics held in Atlanta, United States in the 4 x 400 metre relay where he won the silver medal with his team mates Iwan Thomas, Jamie Baulch and Roger Black. This team set a UK record, 2:56.60, in the process.

At the 1997 World Championships in Athens, Richardson ran the anchor leg for Great Britain in the 4 × 400 m relay, winning the silver medal. His unofficial split time was 43.5. On 7 January 2010 it was announced that Great Britain's 1997 World Championship 4 × 400 m relay team are to be awarded the gold medal; they were beaten by a U.S. team that included Antonio Pettigrew, who admitted in 2008 to using performance-enhancing drugs.

He represented England and won double silver in the 400 metres and 4 x 400 metres relay, at the 1998 Commonwealth Games in Kuala Lumpur, Malaysia.

Doping case
Richardson received a two-year ban from the IAAF after he failed a drugs test which was taken on 25 October 1999. He was suspended in March 2000 and subsequently missed the 2000 Olympics in Sydney. He tested positive for banned substance nandrolone, but claimed that he was unaware of taking the substance. Unlike fellow competitors Linford Christie, Gary Cadogan and Doug Walker, Richardson accepted the ban and chose not to pursue his case to arbitration. The IAAF did re-instate Richardson in June 2001, under their "exceptional circumstances" rule. UK Athletics also cleared Richardson (as they did with Christie, Cadogan and Walker) as they believed there was enough reasonable doubt over the intention to take a banned substance. The IAAF overrule such decisions because they hold athletes completely responsible for drug samples under a "strict liability rule".

Later career and retirement
Although he was re-instated to competition in 2001, Richardson was never able to deliver on the potential that he showed prior to his ban when he became one of the few athletes ever to beat Michael Johnson over 400m in 1998. He never managed to win a solo gold medal at a major championship and retired from the sport after failing to recover from an Achilles tendon injury towards the end of 2003.

References

External links
 

1972 births
Living people
British male sprinters
English male sprinters
English sportspeople in doping cases
Doping cases in athletics
Sportspeople from Slough
People educated at Claires Court School
Olympic athletes of Great Britain
Commonwealth Games medallists in athletics
Olympic silver medallists for Great Britain
Olympic bronze medallists for Great Britain
Athletes (track and field) at the 1992 Summer Olympics
Athletes (track and field) at the 1996 Summer Olympics
Medalists at the 1992 Summer Olympics
Medalists at the 1996 Summer Olympics
Athletes (track and field) at the 1998 Commonwealth Games
Commonwealth Games silver medallists for England
Alumni of Loughborough University
World Athletics Championships medalists
European Athletics Championships medalists
Olympic silver medalists in athletics (track and field)
Olympic bronze medalists in athletics (track and field)
World Athletics Championships winners
Medallists at the 1998 Commonwealth Games